Aviator Glacier is a major valley glacier in Antarctica that is over  long and  wide, descending generally southward from the plateau of Victoria Land along the west side of Mountaineer Range, and entering Lady Newnes Bay between Cape Sibbald and Hayes Head where it forms the Aviator Glacier Tongue.

A glacier is a mass of ice with sufficient thickness to flow away from the source area in lobes, tongues or masses. Glaciers are usually found at high latitudes or high elevations.

The glacier was photographed from the air by Captain W.M. Hawkes, US Navy, on the historic first flight from New Zealand to McMurdo Sound on December 17, 1955. An attempt to reconnoiter it by helicopter and to land a party of the New Zealand Geological Survey Antarctic Expedition (NZGSAE) on it had to be abandoned when USS Glacier was damaged in pressure ice in December 1958. It was named by NZGSAE, 1958–59, as a tribute to the hazardous work of pilots and other airmen in Antarctic exploratory and scientific operations.

Aviator Glacier Tongue
The Aviator Glacier Tongue in Antarctica is a seaward extension of Aviator Glacier into the Ross Sea, between Wood Bay and Lady Newness Bay along the coast of Victoria Land. 
The name was recommended by the Advisory Committee on Antarctic Names in association with Aviator Glacier.

See also
 List of glaciers in the Antarctic
 Glaciology

References

Glaciers of Borchgrevink Coast